DC, D.C., D/C, Dc, or dc may refer to:

Places 

 Washington, D.C. (District of Columbia), the capital and the federal territory of the United States of America
 Bogotá, Distrito Capital, the capital city of Colombia
 Dubai City, as distinct from the Emirate of Dubai

Science, technology and mathematics 

 DC or Direct current, electric current which flows in only one direction
 DC bias, a waveform's mean value
 Decicoulomb (dC), a unit of electric charge
 Dené–Caucasian languages, of east Asia and western North America
 New Zealand DC class locomotive
 Methylphosphonyl dichloride, a chemical weapons precursor

Biology and medicine 

 DC., standard author abbreviation for botanist Augustin Pyramus de Candolle (1778-1841)
 Dendritic cell, a type of immune cell
 Doctor of Chiropractic, a qualification in alternative medicine

Computing 

 dc (computer program), a desktop calculator
 DC coefficient a.k.a. constant component in discrete cosine transform
 Data center, a physical location housing computing-related gear
 Device Context, part of the Microsoft Windows API
 Differential cryptanalysis, a form of cryptanalysis
 DigiCipher, a digital encoding scheme
 Direct Connect (protocol)
 Domain Component, an attribute in LDAP
 Domain controller, a server used to manage a Windows domain
 Dublin Core, a metadata standard
 Dynamic contrast, an LCD technology

Mathematics 

 dc (elliptic function), one of Jacobi's elliptic functions
 Axiom of dependent choice, in set theory
 600 (number), in Roman numerals
 220 (number), in hexadecimal

Arts, entertainment and media 

 D.C. (TV series)
 DC Comics, the American comic book publisher
 Detective Comics, its eponymous comic book series
 DC Inside, a South Korean internet forum
 DC (Succession), an episode of television series Succession
 Director's cut, a version of a film edited by its director

Music 

 Da capo, a musical term
 DC Recordings, owned by Jonathan Saul Kane
 Destiny's Child, an American R&B group
 Drum Connection, a German pop group
 DC Talk, a Christian rap and rock trio.

Video games 

 Da Capo (visual novel)
 Deadly Creatures, a 2009 action video game
 Desert Combat, a Battlefield 1942 mod
 Digital Chaos, a professional Dota 2 eSports team
 Dino Crisis, a survival horror game series
 Dreamcast, a video game console
 Donut County, a video game by Ben Esposito

Companies and products 

 DC Recordings
 DC Shoes, an American sports footwear company
 Deloitte Consulting, a multinational management consulting firm
 Delta Clipper, a proposed rocketship series by McDonnell Douglas
 Dick Clark Productions
 Diet Coke, a soft drink
 Disney Channel
 Doritos chips
 Douglas Commercial, a series of aircraft by the Douglas Aircraft Company (and later McDonnell Douglas)
 Drawception, an online game where a person comes up with something to draw, someone else draws it, someone else interprets that drawing, then someone tries to draw that interpretation, and so on
 Dyson vacuum cleaners, which use product code prefix DC
 Golden Air, an airline (IATA code DC)

Government, law, and military 

 Christian Democracy (Italy), a political party
 Christian Democracy (Brazil), a political party
 Detective constable, a rank in the British and several other police forces
 Development control in the United Kingdom, a land regulation process
 District collector, an Indian Administrative Service officer in charge of revenue collection and administration of a district
 District Commissioner, a rank in the British former Colonial Service
 District Court
 Dossier criminal, in Indian policing

People 

 D. C. Douglas, American voice actor and director
 D. C. Fontana (Dorothy Catherine Fontana) (1939–2019), American screenwriter known primarily for work on Star Trek
 D/C, stage name of British singer-songwriter Dan Caplen
 Dalton Castle (wrestler) (born 1986)
 Daniel Cormier (born 1979) Olympic wrestler and heavyweight mixed martial artist
 David Coulthard (born 1971) British racing driver, known as DC
 DC., taxonomic author abbreviation of Swiss botanist Augustin Pyramus de Candolle (1778–1841)
 D. C. Drake (born 1957), American addictions counselor, and retired professional wrestler
 Donald L. Cox (1936–2011), American leader of the Black Panther Party, known as Field Marshal DC
 D. C. Reeves, American businessman, journalist and politician

Religion 

 DC, a dominical letter indicating a leap year starting on Thursday
 Christian Doctrine Fathers, a Catholic organization
 Daughters of Charity of Saint Vincent de Paul, a Society of Apostolic Life for women within the Catholic Church

Schools 

 Delaware County Christian School, in Newtown Township, Delaware County, Pennsylvania, United States
 Dhaka College, in Dhaka, Bangladesh
 Diné College, on the Navajo Nation, United States
 Dominican Convent High School, Harare, a Catholic high school for girls in Harare, Zimbabwe
 Dominican Convent High School, Bulawayo, a Catholic high school for girls in Bulawayo, Zimbabwe
 Dominican Convent Primary School, Bulawayo, a Catholic preparatory school for girls in Bulawayo, Zimbabwe
 D'Youville College, former name of the Buffalo, New York institution now known as D'Youville University

Sports 

 Defensive coordinator, a coaching position in American and Canadian football
 Delhi Capitals, an Indian Premier League cricket franchise
 Deccan Chargers, a former Indian Premier League cricket franchise

Other uses 

 Distribution center, a building housing goods to be distributed to retailers, wholesalers, or consumers
 Dust collector, equipment in a woodworking shop
 Driverless car
 Discharge (disambiguation)
 Dream character, an imaginary person that only appears in dreams

See also 

 
 
 D&C (disambiguation)
 AC/DC (disambiguation)